Fjellgardane Church is a parish church of the Church of Norway in Bykle Municipality in Agder county, Norway. It is located in the village of Hovden. It is one of the churches for the Bykle parish which is part of the Otredal prosti (deanery) in the Diocese of Agder og Telemark. The brown, wooden church was built in a long church design in 1957. The church seats about 110 people.

History
Hovden Chapel was built in 1957 to serve the Hovden community. It was consecrated on 22 September 1957 by the Bishop Johannes Smidt. The small chapel cost . In 2002, the church was renovated by the architect Torjus Bjåen and it was enlarged and renamed Fjellgardane Church.

See also
List of churches in Agder og Telemark

References

Bykle
Churches in Agder
Wooden churches in Norway
20th-century Church of Norway church buildings
Churches completed in 1957
1957 establishments in Norway